The Sud-Est SE.200 Amphitrite (named after Amphitrite) was a flying boat airliner built in France in the late 1930s, originally developed as the Lioré et Olivier LeO H-49 before the nationalisation of the French aircraft industry. It was a large, six-engine design with a high-set cantilever monoplane wing, and twin tails. Designs were submitted by Latécoère, Lioré et Olivier and by Potez-CAMS as the Laté 631, LeO H.49 and the Potez-CAMS 161 respectively, and examples of all designs were approved for construction. A large mock-up, resting on simulated water, was displayed at the 1938 Salon de l'Aéronautique.

Four SE.200s were under construction at Marignane at the outbreak of the Second World War, and work on them continued after the fall of France, along with a fifth machine now started. The first aircraft, christened Rochambeau flew on 11 December 1942. Following testing, it was seized by the German occupation and taken to the Bodensee, where it was destroyed in an air-raid by RAF Mosquitos on 17 April 1944. A USAAF raid on Marignane on 16 September destroyed the second SE.200 and badly damaged the other machines.

Enough work on the third SE.200 had been carried out to make salvage worthwhile after the war. This aircraft eventually flew on 2 April 1946 but was damaged in a hard landing in October 1949 and was not repaired. Plans existed to also complete the fourth aircraft, but this did not happen and it and the fifth machine were scrapped. The remains of the first SE.200 were raised by Dornier in 1966.

Operators

French Navy

Specifications

See also

References

Notes

Bibliography

 
 
 
 
 
 
"Six Motored French Air Giant Weighs 63-tons" Popular Mechanics, June 1943
 

1940s French airliners
Flying boats
Lioré et Olivier aircraft
SE-0200
Six-engined tractor aircraft
High-wing aircraft
Aircraft first flown in 1942